Samuel Gettys (1725–15 March 1790) was a settler and tavern owner in south-central Pennsylvania during the late 1780s.  The borough of Gettysburg, Pennsylvania, which was founded in 1786, was named after him.

Formative years
Born in 1725 in Randalstown, County Antrim, Ireland, Samuel Gettys was the husband of Isabella (Ramsey) Gettys (1731–1815), the sister of Reynolds Ramsey, grandfather of historian J. G. M. Ramsey. Their children were: Mary (Gettys) Linn (1752–1823), William Gettys (1757–1813), and James Gettys (1759–1815).

American Revolution
Samuel Gettys gave funds to the Continental Army during the American Revolutionary War, but, soon after it won, he was rich in land but poor in cash; so he decided to sell off his plots of land in order to achieve financial stability. His son, James, bought his land and sold it off in parcel lots.

Death and interment
Gettys died in Gettysburg on March 15, 1790, and was buried at Black's Graveyard in that city.

References

American city founders
Drinking establishment owners
American pioneers
18th-century American people
People from Gettysburg, Pennsylvania
People of colonial Pennsylvania
1725 births
1790 deaths